Florin Marian Răsdan (born 13 April 1995) is a Romanian professional footballer who plays as a midfielder for Liga II side Viitorul Târgu Jiu.

Honours
CSA Steaua București
Liga III: 2020–21
Liga IV: 2019–20

References

External links

 
 

1995 births
Living people
Footballers from Bucharest
Romanian footballers
Association football midfielders
Liga I players
Liga II players
CS Concordia Chiajna players
FC Brașov (1936) players
CSA Steaua București footballers
ACS Viitorul Târgu Jiu players